Christian Clark (born 15 September 1978) is an Australian actor and business owner. Christian appeared in the role of Will Griggs in the Network Ten soap opera Neighbours from 2006 to 2007 and played Penn Graham in Home and Away in 2010.

Career
Clark graduated from Screenwise, Australia's leading film and television school for actors in Sydney. He is a former personal trainer and international model. Clark has also appeared in various commercials aired around the world. He appeared alongside Bec Cartwright in her music video for "On the Borderline".

After studying with various acting schools in Sydney and New York, Clark joined the cast of Neighbours in 2006, playing Will Griggs. Clark chose not to renew his twelve-week contract with Network Ten and departed in January 2007.

Clark has had roles in a number of films including Gabriel, directed by Shane Abbess and Gates of Hell directed by Kelly Dolen. Clark followed these with thriller features Prey with Natalie Bassingthwaighte and Crush with Chris Egan and Emma Lung. Clark also produces and writes between acting roles, co-producing the comedy feature Squid, while starring alongside Josh Lawson and Ed Kavalee. Clark produced and starred in Scumbus, a film by Ed Kavalee, which starred an ensemble comedy cast of Toby Truslove, Ed Kavalee, Glen Robbins, Peter Helliar, Dave Hughes, Tony Martin, Henry Nixon.

Clark has appeared in television shows False Witness, Rescue: Special Ops, Mr & Mrs Murder and various short films and pilots. In 2010, Clark joined Home and Away as the mysterious Penn Graham, a man who terrorised established character Alf Stewart (Ray Meagher).

Clark starred as Jason in Border Protection Squad with Peter Helliar and Ryan Shelton, directed by Ed Kavalee, also starring Dave Hughes, Andy Lee, Lachy Hulme, Fitzy, Ash Williams, Luke McGregor, Tony Martin. He also had a supporting role in the 2012 Australian comedy Any Questions for Ben?, created by Working Dog Productions.

Clark starred as Jakob in Nerve which premiered at Sydney Film Festival. It also starred Gary Sweet, Georgina Haig, Craig Hall, Denise Roberts and Sara Wiseman.

Filmography

References

External links
Screenwise

Australian male soap opera actors
Australian male film actors
Australian male models
1979 births
Living people